Musakhan, also known as muhammar, is a Palestinian dish composed of roasted chicken baked with onions, sumac, allspice, saffron, and fried pine nuts served over taboon bread. Originating in the Tulkarm and Jenin area, musakhan is often considered the national dish of Palestine. The dish is particularly popular among Palestinians, Israeli Arabs and Jordanians. In Israel, it is eaten by Israeli Arabs and Israeli Druze in Galilee, especially around Iksal and Sandala, and in the Triangle. The dish can be found in Syria, Lebanon and Jordan as well. 

Musakhan is simple to make and the ingredients needed are easily obtainable, which may account for the dish's popularity. Many of the ingredients used—olive oil, sumac and pine nuts—are staples of Palestinian cuisine. The dish is typically eaten with one's hands. It is usually presented with the chicken on top of the bread, and could be served with soup.

Nutritional information 
A typical recipe of musakhan has the following nutrition facts per serving (around 300 g):
 Calories: 391
 Total fat (g): 33
 Saturated fat (g): 7
 Cholesterol (mg): 92
 Carbohydrates (g): 0
 Protein (g): 23

World records

On April 20, 2010, the largest ever dish of musakhan was prepared in Ramallah, Palestine and was entered into the Guinness Book of World Records. Palestinian Prime Minister, Salam Fayad, described it as a great achievement and honor for the Palestinian people: "This great achievement completely depended on Palestinian products, mainly olive oil. It also has a cultural dimension and a Palestinian message to the world that they want their legitimate rights." The total diameter of the musakhan loaf was 4 meters, with a total weight of 1,350 kg. Forty Palestinian cooks made use of 250 kg of flour, 170 kg of olive oil, 500 kg of onions and 70 kg of almond.

Gallery

See also
 Palestinian cuisine
 List of chicken dishes

References

 JORDANIAN MUSAKHAN CHICKEN Recipe

Arab cuisine
Baked foods
Chicken dishes
Israeli cuisine
Jordanian cuisine
Palestinian cuisine
National dishes
Palestinian inventions